Mohan may refer to:

People
 Mohan Shumsher JBR, Former prime minister of Nepal
 Mohan (actor) (born 1956), Indian film actor
 Mohan (director), Indian director of Malayalam films
 Mohan (name), a name generally found among Hindus
 Mohan (clan), a clan of the Mohyal caste in India

Places

Inhabited places
 Mohan, Uttar Pradesh, town and nagar panchayat Uttar Pradesh, India
 Mohan, Yunnan, a town in China
 Ambheta Mohan, a village in Uttar Pradesh, India
 Braja Mohan, a village in the Barisal Division, Bangladesh
 Mohan Majra, a village in Punjab, India

Other places
 Mohan Pass, Siwalik Hills in Sikkim
 Mohan (Vidhan Sabha constituency) An Assembly constituency) in Uttar Pradesh, India
 Mohan Nagar metro station
 Mohan Estate metro station

Other uses
 Melaleuca viminea, a shrub or tree from Western Australia with the common name Mohan
 Mohan (1947 film), a 1947 Indian Hindi film directed by Anadinath Bannerjee
 Mohan (legendary), a name applied to several supernatural creatures in Latin American folklore
 Mohan convention, a convention in the game of bridge
 Mohan Meakin Brewery, a large group of companies started with Asia's first brewery, incorporated in 1855
 Mohan veena, two distinct Indian classical instruments
 Pyare Mohan, a 2006 Indian Hindi film
 Mohan, another name for Krishna, a major Hindu deity

See also
 Mohana (disambiguation)
 Mahan (disambiguation)